Quercus chungii is an uncommon species of tree in the beech family. It has been found only  in  southern China, in the Provinces of Guangxi, and Guizhou. It is placed in subgenus Cerris, section Cyclobalanopsis.

Quercus chungii is a tree up to 15 meters tall with brown hairy twigs and leaves as much as 12 cm long.

References

External links
line drawing, Flora of China Illustrations vol. 4, figure 394, drawings 8-10 at lower right

chungii
Flora of China
Plants described in 1931